Michael Stephen Camacho (born 4 March 1953 in Antigua) is a former West Indian cricketer who played first-class and List A cricket for the Combined Islands and the Leeward Islands cricket teams.

References

External links

1953 births
Living people
Antigua and Barbuda cricketers
Combined Islands cricketers
Leeward Islands cricketers